The Chicago Tribune is a daily newspaper based in Chicago, Illinois, United States, owned by Tribune Publishing. Founded in 1847, and formerly self-styled as the "World's Greatest Newspaper" (a slogan for which WGN radio and television are named), it remains the most-read daily newspaper in the Chicago metropolitan area and the Great Lakes region. In 2017, it had the sixth-highest circulation of any American newspaper.

In the 1850s, under Joseph Medill, the Chicago Tribune became closely associated with the Illinois politician Abraham Lincoln, and the Republican Party's progressive wing. In the 20th century, under Medill's grandson Robert R. McCormick, it achieved a reputation as a crusading paper with a decidedly more American-conservative anti-New Deal outlook, and its writing reached other markets through family and corporate relationships at the New York Daily News and the Washington Times-Herald. The 1960s saw its corporate parent owner, Tribune Company, reach into new markets. In 2008, for the first time in its over-a-century-and-a-half history, its editorial page endorsed a Democrat, Illinoisan Barack Obama, for U.S. president.

Originally published solely as a broadsheet, the Tribune announced on January 13, 2009, that it would continue publishing as a broadsheet for home delivery, but would publish in tabloid format for newsstand, news box, and commuter station sales. This change, however, proved to be unpopular with readers, and in August 2011, the Tribune discontinued the tabloid edition, returning to its established broadsheet format through all distribution channels.

The Tribunes masthead displays the American flag, in reference to the paper's former motto, "An American Paper for Americans". The motto is no longer displayed on the masthead, where it was placed below the flag.

The Tribune was owned by parent company Tribune Publishing. In May 2021, Tribune Publishing was acquired by Alden Global Capital, which operates its media properties through Digital First Media.

History

Beginnings
The Tribune was founded by James Kelly, John E. Wheeler, and Joseph K. C. Forrest, publishing the first edition on June 10, 1847. Numerous changes in ownership and editorship took place over the next eight years. Initially, the Tribune was not politically affiliated, but tended to support either the Whig or Free Soil parties against the Democrats in elections. By late 1853, it was frequently running xenophobic editorials that criticized foreigners and Roman Catholics. About this time it also became a strong proponent of temperance. However nativist its editorials may have been, it was not until February 10, 1855, that the Tribune formally affiliated itself with the nativist American or Know Nothing party, whose candidate Levi Boone was elected Mayor of Chicago the following month.

Medill editorship

By about 1854, part-owner Capt. J. D. Webster, later General Webster and chief of staff at the Battle of Shiloh, and Dr. Charles H. Ray of Galena, Illinois, through Horace Greeley, convinced Joseph Medill of Cleveland's Leader to become managing editor. Ray became editor-in-chief, Medill became the managing editor, and Alfred Cowles, Sr., brother of Edwin Cowles, initially was the bookkeeper. Each purchased one third of the Tribune. Under their leadership, the Tribune distanced itself from the Know Nothings, and became the main Chicago organ of the Republican Party. However, the paper continued to print anti-Catholic and anti-Irish editorials, in the wake of the massive Famine immigration from Ireland.

The Tribune absorbed three other Chicago publications under the new editors: the Free West in 1855, the Democratic Press of William Bross in 1858, and the Chicago Democrat in 1861, whose editor, John Wentworth, left his position when elected as Mayor of Chicago. Between 1858 and 1860, the paper was known as the Chicago Press & Tribune. On October 25, 1860, it became the Chicago Daily Tribune. Before and during the American Civil War, the new editors strongly supported Abraham Lincoln, whom Medill helped secure the presidency in 1860, and pushed an abolitionist agenda. The paper remained a force in Republican politics for years afterwards.

In 1861, the Tribune published new lyrics by William W. Patton for the song "John Brown's Body". These rivaled the lyrics published two months later by Julia Ward Howe. Medill served as mayor of Chicago for one term after the Great Chicago Fire of 1871.

Years of McCormick
Under the 20th-century editorship of Colonel Robert R. McCormick, who took control in the 1920s, the paper was strongly isolationist and aligned with the Old Right in its coverage of political news and social trends. It used the motto "The American Paper for Americans". From the 1930s to the 1950s, it excoriated the Democrats and the New Deal of Franklin D. Roosevelt, was resolutely disdainful of the British and French, and greatly enthusiastic for Chiang Kai-shek and Sen. Joseph McCarthy.

When McCormick assumed the position of co-editor (with his cousin Joseph Medill Patterson) in 1910, the Tribune was the third-best-selling paper among Chicago's eight dailies, with a circulation of only 188,000. The young cousins added features such as advice columns and homegrown comic strips such as Little Orphan Annie and Moon Mullins. They promoted political "crusades", with their first success coming with the ouster of the Republican political boss of Illinois, Sen. William Lorimer. At the same time, the Tribune competed with the Hearst paper, the Chicago Examiner, in a circulation war. By 1914, the cousins succeeded in forcing out Managing Editor William Keeley. By 1918, the Examiner was forced to merge with the Chicago Herald.

In 1919, Patterson left the Tribune and moved to New York to launch his own newspaper, the New York Daily News. In a renewed circulation war with Hearst's Herald-Examiner, McCormick and Hearst ran rival lotteries in 1922. The Tribune won the battle, adding 250,000 readers to its ranks. Also in 1922, the Chicago Tribune hosted an international design competition for its new headquarters, the Tribune Tower. The competition worked brilliantly as a publicity stunt, and more than 260 entries were received. The winner was a neo-Gothic design by New York architects John Mead Howells and Raymond Hood.

The newspaper sponsored a pioneering attempt at Arctic aviation in 1929, an attempted round-trip to Europe across Greenland and Iceland in a Sikorsky amphibious aircraft. But, the aircraft was destroyed by ice on July 15, 1929, near Ungava Bay at the tip of Labrador, Canada. The crew were rescued by the Canadian science ship CSS Acadia.

The Tribunes reputation for innovation extended to radio—it bought an early station, WDAP, in 1924 and renamed it WGN (AM), the station call letters standing for the paper's self-description as the "World's Greatest Newspaper". WGN Television was launched on April 5, 1948. These broadcast stations remained Tribune properties for nine decades and were among the oldest newspaper/broadcasting cross-ownerships in the country. (The Tribunes East Coast sibling, the New York Daily News, later established WPIX television and radio.)

The Tribunes legendary sports editor Arch Ward created the Major League Baseball All-Star Game in 1933 as part of the city's Century of Progress exposition.

From 1940 to 1943, the paper supplemented its comic strip offerings with The Chicago Tribune Comic Book, responding to the new success of comic books. At the same time, it launched the more successful and longer-lasting The Spirit Section, which was also an attempt by newspapers to compete with the new medium.

Under McCormick's stewardship, the Tribune was a champion of modified spelling for simplicity (such as spelling "although" as "altho"). McCormick, a vigorous campaigner for the Republican Party, died in 1955, just four days before Democratic boss Richard J. Daley was elected mayor for the first time.

One of the great scoops in Tribune history came when it obtained the text of the Treaty of Versailles in June 1919. Another was its revelation of United States war plans on the eve of the Pearl Harbor attack. The Tribunes June 7, 1942, front page announcement that the United States had broken Japan's naval code was the revelation by the paper of a closely guarded military secret. The story revealing that Americans broke the enemy naval codes was not cleared by censors, and had U.S. President Franklin D. Roosevelt so enraged that he considered shutting down the Tribune.

1948 U.S. presidential election

The paper is well known for a mistake it made during the 1948 presidential election. At that time, much of its composing room staff was on strike. The early returns led editors to believe (along with many in the country) that the Republican candidate Thomas Dewey would win. An early edition of the next day's paper carried the headline "Dewey Defeats Truman", turning the paper into a collector's item. Democrat Harry S. Truman won and proudly brandished the newspaper in a famous picture taken at St. Louis Union Station. Beneath the headline was a false article, written by Arthur Sears Henning, which purported to describe West Coast results although written before East Coast election returns were available.

Pulitzer Prizes
Colonel McCormick prevented the Tribune for years from participating in the Pulitzer Prize competition. But it has won 28 of the awards over the years, including many for editorial writing. The Tribune won its first post-McCormick Pulitzer in 1961, when Carey Orr won the award for editorial cartooning. Reporter George Bliss won a Pulitzer the following year for reporting, and reporter Bill Jones another in 1971 for reporting. A reporting team won the award in 1973, followed by reporter William Mullen and photographer Ovie Carter, who won a Pulitzer for international reporting in 1975. A local reporting team won the award in 1976, and architecture critic Paul Gapp won a Pulitzer in 1979. In 2022, Cecilia Reyes, Chicago Tribune, and Madison Hopkins, Better Government Association, won a Pulitzer Prize in local reporting for a piercing examination of the city’s long history of failed building- and fire-safety code enforcement, which let scofflaw landlords commit serious violations that resulted in dozens of unnecessary deaths.

The Watergate years
In 1969, under the leadership of publisher Harold Grumhaus and editor Clayton Kirkpatrick (1915–2004), the Tribune began reporting from a wider viewpoint. The paper retained its Republican and conservative perspective in its editorials, but it began to publish perspectives in wider commentary that represented a spectrum of diverse opinions, while its news reporting no longer had the conservative slant it had in the McCormick years.

On May 1, 1974, in a major feat of journalism, the Tribune published the complete 246,000-word text of the Watergate tapes, in a 44-page supplement that hit the streets 24 hours after the transcripts' release by the Nixon White House. Not only was the Tribune the first newspaper to publish the transcripts, but it beat the U.S. Government Printing Office's published version, and made headlines doing so.

A week later, after studying the transcripts, the paper's editorial board observed that "the high dedication to grand principles that Americans have a right to expect from a President is missing from the transcript record." The Tribunes editors concluded that "nobody of sound mind can read [the transcripts] and continue to think that Mr. Nixon has upheld the standards and dignity of the Presidency," and called for Nixon's resignation. The Tribune call for Nixon to resign made news, reflecting not only the change in the type of conservatism practiced by the paper, but as a watershed event in terms of Nixon's hopes for survival in office. The White House reportedly perceived the Tribunes editorial as a loss of a long-time supporter and as a blow to Nixon's hopes to weather the scandal.

In January 1977, Tribune columnist Will Leonard died at age 64.

In March 1978, the Tribune announced that it hired columnist Bob Greene from the Chicago Sun-Times.

Rick Soll
On December 7, 1975, Kirkpatrick announced in a column on the editorial page that Rick Soll, a "young and talented columnist" for the paper, whose work had "won a following among many Tribune readers over the last two years", had resigned from the paper. He had acknowledged that a November 23, 1975 column he wrote contained verbatim passages written by another columnist in 1967 and later published in a collection. Kirkpatrick did not identify the columnist. The passages in question, Kirkpatrick wrote, were from a notebook where Soll regularly entered words, phrases and bits of conversation which he had wished to remember. The paper initially suspended Soll for a month without pay. Kirkpatrick wrote that further evidence was revealed came out that another of Soll's columns contained information which he knew was false. At that point, Tribune editors decided to accept the resignation offered by Soll when the internal investigation began.

After leaving, Soll married Pam Zekman, a Chicago newspaper (and future TV) reporter. He worked for the short-lived Chicago Times magazine, by Small Newspaper Group Inc. of Kankakee, Illinois, in the late 1980s.

Soll was born in 1946, in Chicago, to Marjorie and Jules Soll. Soll graduated from New Trier High School, received a Bachelor of Arts in 1968 from Colgate University, and a Master's Degree from Medill School of Journalism, Northwestern University in 1970.

1980s and 1990s
Kirkpatrick stepped down as editor in 1979 and was succeeded by Maxwell McCrohon (1928–2004), who served as editor until 1981. He was transitioned to a corporate position. McCrohon held the corporate position until 1983, when he left to become editor-in-chief of the United Press International. James Squires served as the paper's editor from July 1981 until December 1989.

Jack Fuller served as the Tribune's editor from 1989 until 1993, when he became the president and chief executive officer of the Chicago Tribune. Howard Tyner served as the Tribune's editor from 1993 until 2001, when he was promoted to vice president/editorial for Tribune Publishing.

The Tribune won 11 Pulitzer prizes during the 1980s and 1990s. Editorial cartoonist Dick Locher won the award in 1983, and editorial cartoonist Jeff MacNelly won one in 1985. Then, future editor Jack Fuller won a Pulitzer for editorial writing in 1986. In 1987, reporters Jeff Lyon and Peter Gorner won a Pulitzer for explanatory reporting, and in 1988, Dean Baquet, William Gaines and Ann Marie Lipinski won a Pulitzer for investigative reporting. In 1989, Lois Wille won a Pulitzer for editorial writing and Clarence Page snagged the award for commentary. In 1994, Ron Kotulak won a Pulitzer for explanatory journalism, while R. Bruce Dold won it for editorial writing. In 1998, reporter Paul Salopek won a Pulitzer for explanatory writing, and in 1999, architecture critic Blair Kamin won it for criticism.

In September 1981, baseball writer Jerome Holtzman was hired by the Tribune after a 38-year career at the Sun-Times.

In September 1982, the Chicago Tribune opened a new $180 million printing facility, Freedom Center.

In November 1982, Tribune managing editor William H. "Bill" Jones, who had won a Pulitzer Prize in 1971, died at age 43 of cardiac arrest as a result of complications from a long battle with leukemia.

In May 1983, Tribune columnist Aaron Gold died at age 45 of complications from leukemia. Gold had coauthored the Tribune's "Inc." column with Michael Sneed and prior to that had written the paper's "Tower Ticker" column.

The Tribune scored a coup in 1984 when it hired popular columnist Mike Royko away from the rival Sun-Times.

In 1986, the Tribune announced that film critic Gene Siskel, the Tribunes best-known writer, was no longer the paper's film critic, and that his position with the paper had shifted from being that of a full-time film critic to that of a freelance contract writer who was to write about the film industry for the Sunday paper and also provide capsule film reviews for the paper's entertainment sections. The demotion occurred after Siskel and longtime Chicago film critic colleague Roger Ebert decided to shift the production of their weekly movie-review show—then known as At the Movies with Gene Siskel and Roger Ebert and later known as Siskel & Ebert & The Movies—from Tribune Entertainment to The Walt Disney Company's Buena Vista Television unit. "He has done a great job for us," editor James Squires said at the time. "It's a question of how much a person can do physically. We think you need to be a newspaper person first, and Gene Siskel has always tried to do that. But there comes a point when a career is so big that you can't do that." Siskel declined to comment on the new arrangement, but Ebert publicly criticized Siskel's Tribune bosses for punishing Siskel for taking their television program to a company other than Tribune Entertainment. Siskel remained in that freelance position until he died in 1999. He was replaced as film critic by Dave Kehr.

In February 1988, Tribune foreign correspondent Jonathan Broder resigned after a February 22, 1988, Tribune article written by Broder contained a number of sentences and phrases taken, without attribution, from a column written by another writer, Joel Greenberg, that had been published 10 days earlier in The Jerusalem Post.

In August 1988, Chicago Tribune reporter Michael Coakley died at age 41 of complications from AIDS.

In November 1992, Tribune associate subject editor Searle "Ed" Hawley was arrested by Chicago police and charged with seven counts of aggravated criminal sexual abuse for allegedly having sex with three juveniles in his home in Evanston, Illinois. Hawley formally resigned from the paper in early 1993, and pleaded guilty in April 1993. He was sentenced to 3 years in prison.

In an unusual move at that time, the Tribune in October 1993 fired its longtime military-affairs writer, retired-Marine David Evans, with the public position that the post of military affairs was being dropped in favor of having a national security writer.

In December 1993, the Tribunes longtime Washington, D.C. bureau chief, Nicholas Horrock, was removed from his post after he chose not to attend a meeting that editor Howard Tyner requested of him in Chicago. Horrock, who shortly thereafter left the paper, was replaced by James Warren, who attracted new attention to the Tribunes D.C. bureau through his continued attacks on celebrity broadcast journalists in Washington.

Also in December 1993, the Tribune hired Margaret Holt from the South Florida Sun-Sentinel as its assistant managing editor for sports, making her the first female to head a sports department at any of the nation's 10 largest newspapers. In mid-1995, Holt was replaced as sports editor by Tim Franklin and shifted to a newly created job, customer service editor.

In 1994, reporter Brenda You was fired by the Tribune after free-lancing for supermarket tabloid newspapers and lending them photographs from the Tribunes photo library. You later worked for the National Enquirer and as a producer for The Jerry Springer Show before committing suicide in November 2005.

In April 1994, the Tribunes new television critic, Ken Parish Perkins, wrote an article about then-WFLD morning news anchor Bob Sirott in which Perkins quoted Sirott as making a statement that Sirott later denied making. Sirott criticized Perkins on the air, and the Tribune later printed a correction acknowledging that Sirott had never made that statement. Eight months later, Perkins stepped down as TV critic, and he left the paper shortly thereafter.

In December 1995, the alternative newsweekly Newcity published a first-person article by the pseudonymous Clara Hamon (a name mentioned in the play The Front Page) but quickly identified by Tribune reporters as that of former Tribune reporter Mary Hill that heavily criticized the paper's one-year residency program. The program brought young journalists in and out of the paper for one-year stints, seldom resulting in a full-time job. Hill, who wrote for the paper from 1992 until 1993, acknowledged to the Chicago Reader that she had written the diatribe originally for the Internet, and that the piece eventually was edited for Newcity.

In 1997, the Tribune celebrated its 150th anniversary in part by tapping longtime reporter Stevenson Swanson to edit the book Chicago Days: 150 Defining Moments in the Life of a Great City.

On April 29, 1997, popular columnist Mike Royko died of a brain aneurysm. On September 2, 1997, the Tribune promoted longtime City Hall reporter John Kass to take Royko's place as the paper's principal Page Two news columnist.

On June 1, 1997, the Tribune published what ended up becoming a very popular column by Mary Schmich called "Advice, like youth, probably just wasted on the young", otherwise known as "Wear Sunscreen" or the "Sunscreen Speech". The most popular and well-known form of the essay is the successful music single released in 1999, accredited to Baz Luhrmann.

In 1998, reporter Jerry Thomas was fired by the Tribune after he wrote a cover article on boxing promoter Don King for Emerge magazine at the same time that he was writing a cover article on King for the Chicago Tribune Sunday magazine. The paper decided to fire Thomas—and suspend his photographer on the Emerge story, Pulitzer Prize-winning Tribune photographer Ovie Carter for a month—because Thomas did not tell the Tribune about his outside work and also because the Emerge story wound up appearing in print first.

On June 6, 1999, the Tribune published a first-person travel article from freelance writer Gaby Plattner that described a supposed incident in which a pilot for Air Zimbabwe who was flying without a copilot inadvertently locked himself out of his cockpit while the plane was flying on autopilot and as a result needed to use a large ax to chop a hole in the cockpit door. An airline representative wrote a lengthy letter to the paper calling the account "totally untrue, unprofessional and damaging to our airline" and explaining that Air Zimbabwe does not keep axes on its aircraft and never flies without a full crew, and the paper was forced to print a correction stating that Plattner "now says that she passed along a story she had heard as something she had experienced."

The Tribune has been a leader on the Internet, acquiring 10 percent of America Online in the early 1990s, then launching such web sites as Chicagotribune.com (1995), Metromix.com (1996), ChicagoSports.com (1999), ChicagoBreakingNews.com (2008), and ChicagoNow (2009). In 2002, the paper launched a tabloid edition targeted at 18- to 34-year-olds known as RedEye.

2000s
Ann Marie Lipinski was the paper's editor from February 2001 until stepping down on July 17, 2008. Gerould W. Kern was named the paper's editor in July 2008. In early August 2008, managing editor for news Hanke Gratteau resigned, and several weeks later, managing editor for features James Warren resigned as well. Both were replaced by Jane Hirt, who previously had been the editor of the Tribunes RedEye tabloid.

In June 2000, Times Mirror merged with Tribune Company making The Baltimore Sun and its community papers Baltimore Sun Media Group / Patuxent Publishing a subsidiary of Tribune.

In July 2000, Tribune outdoors columnist John Husar, who had written about his need for a new liver transplant, died at age 63, just over a week after receiving part of a new liver from a live donor.

Tribune's Baltimore Community papers include Arbutus Times, Baltimore Messenger, Catonsville Times, Columbia Flier, Howard County Times, The Jeffersonian, Laurel Leader, Lifetimes, North County News, Northeast Booster, Northeast Reporter, Owings Mills Times, and Towson Times.

The Howard County Times was named 2010 Newspaper of the Year by the Suburban Newspaper Association.

The Towson Times expands coverage beyond the Towson area and includes Baltimore County government and politics.

The Tribune won five Pulitzer prizes in the first decade of the 21st century. Salopek won his second Pulitzer for the Tribune in 2001 for international reporting, and that same year an explanatory reporting team—lead writers of which were Louise Kiernan, Jon Hilkevitch, Laurie Cohen, Robert Manor, Andrew Martin, John Schmeltzer, Alex Rodriguez and Andrew Zajac—won the honor for a profile of the chaotic U.S. air traffic system. In 2003, editorial writer Cornelia Grumman snagged the award for editorial writing. In 2005, Julia Keller won a Pulitzer for feature reporting on a tornado that struck Utica, Illinois. And, in 2008, an investigative reporting team including Patricia Callahan, Maurice Possley, Sam Roe, Ted Gregory, Michael Oneal, Evan Osnos and photojournalist Scott Strazzante won the Pulitzer for its series about faulty government regulation of defective toys, cribs and car seats.

In late 2001, sports columnist Michael Holley announced he was leaving the Tribune after just two months because he was homesick. He ultimately returned to The Boston Globe, where he had been working immediately before the Tribune had hired him.

On September 15, 2002, Lipinski wrote a terse, page-one note informing readers that the paper's longtime columnist, Bob Greene, resigned effective immediately after acknowledging "engaging in inappropriate sexual conduct some years ago with a girl in her late teens whom he met in connection with his newspaper column." The conduct later was revealed to have occurred in 1988 with a woman who was of the age of consent in Illinois. "Greene's behavior was a serious violation of Tribune ethics and standards for its journalists," Lipinski wrote. "We deeply regret the conduct, its effect on the young woman and the impact this disclosure has on the trust our readers placed in Greene and this newspaper."

In January 2003, Mike Downey, formerly of the Los Angeles Times, was hired as new Tribune sports columnist. He and colleague Rick Morrissey would write the In the Wake of the News Column originated by Ring Lardner.

In March 2004, the Tribune announced that freelance reporter Uli Schmetzer, who retired from the Tribune in 2002 after 16 years as a foreign correspondent, had fabricated the name and occupation of a person he had quoted in a story. The paper terminated Schmetzer as a contract reporter and began a review of the 300 stories that Schmetzer had written over the prior three years.

In May 2004, the Tribune revealed that freelance reporter Mark Falanga was unable to verify some facts that he inserted in a lifestyle-related column that ran on April 18, 2004, about an expensive lunch at a Chicago restaurant—namely, that the restaurant charged $15 for a bottle of water and $35 for a pasta entree. "Upon questioning, the freelance writer indicated the column was based on an amalgam of three restaurants and could not verify the prices," the paper noted. After the correction, the Tribune stopped using Falanga.

In October 2004, Tribune editor Ann Marie Lipinski at the last minute spiked a story written for the paper's WomanNews section by freelance reporter Lisa Bertagnoli titled "You c_nt say that (or can you?)," about a noted vulgarism. The paper ordered every spare body to go to the Tribunes printing plant to pull already-printed WomanNews sections containing the story from the October 27, 2004, package of preprinted sections in the Tribune.

In September 2008, the Tribune considered hiring controversial sports columnist Jay Mariotti, shortly after his abrupt resignation from Tribune archrival Chicago Sun-Times. Discussions ultimately ended, however, after the Sun-Times threatened to sue for violating Mariotti's noncompete agreement, which was to run until August 2009. Sports columnist Rick Morrissey defected to the Sun-Times in December 2009.

In April 2009, 55 Tribune reporters and editors signed their names to an e-mail sent to Kern and managing editor Jane Hirt, questioning why the newspaper's marketing department had solicited subscribers' opinions on stories before they were published, and suggesting that the practice raised ethical questions as well as legal and competitive issues. Reporters declined to speak on the record to the Associated Press about their issues. "We'll let the e-mail speak for itself," reporter John Chase told the AP. In the wake of the controversy, Kern abruptly discontinued the effort, which he described as "a brief market research project".

In the first decade of the 21st century, the Tribune had multiple rounds of reductions of staff through layoffs and buyouts as it has coped with the industrywide declines in advertising revenues:
 In December 2005, the Tribune eliminated 28 editorial positions through a combination of buyouts and layoffs, including what were believed to be the first layoffs in the paper's history. Among the reporters who left the paper in that round were Carol Kleiman, Bill Jauss and Connie Lauerman.
 In June 2007, about 25 newsroom employees took buyouts, including well-known bylines like Charles Madigan, Michael Hirsley and Ronald Kotulak, along with noted photographer Pete Souza.
 In March 2008, the paper gave buyouts to about 25 newsroom employees, including sportswriter Sam Smith.
 On August 15, 2008, the Tribune laid-off more than 40 newsroom and other editorial employees, including reporters Rick Popely, Ray Quintanilla, Lew Freedman, Michael Martinez and Robert Manor.
 Also in August 2008, about 36 editorial employees took voluntary buyouts or resigned, including well-known bylines like Michael Tackett, Ron Silverman, Timothy McNulty, Ed Sherman, Evan Osnos, Steve Franklin, Maurice Possley, Hanke Gratteau, Chuck Osgood and Skip Myslenski.
 On November 12, 2008, five editorial employees in the paper's Washington, D.C. bureau were laid off, including John Crewdson.
 On December 4, 2008, about 11 newsroom employees were laid-off, with one sports columnist, Mike Downey, having departed several weeks earlier when his contract was not renewed. Well-known bylines who were laid off included Neil Milbert, Stevenson Swanson, Lisa Anderson, Phil Marty, Charles Storch, Courtney Flynn and Deborah Horan.
 In February 2009, the Tribune laid off about 20 editorial employees, including several foreign correspondents, and some feature reporters and editors, although several, including Charles Leroux and Jeff Lyon, technically took buyouts. Among those who were let go were reporters Emily Nunn, Susan Chandler, Christine Spolar and Joel Greenberg.
 On April 22, 2009, the paper laid off 53 newsroom employees, including well-known bylines like Patrick Reardon, Melissa Isaacson, Russell Working, Jo Napolitano, Susan Diesenhouse, Beth Botts, Lou Carlozo, Jessica Reaves, Tom Hundley, Alan Artner, Eric Benderoff, James P. Miller, Bob Sakamoto, Terry Bannon and John Mullin. That number was less than the 90 newsroom jobs that Crain's Chicago Business previously had reported were to be eliminated.

The Tribune broke the story on May 29, 2009, that several students had been admitted to the University of Illinois based upon connections or recommendations by the school's Board of Trustees, Chicago politicians, and members of the Rod Blagojevich administration. Initially denying the existence of a so-called "Category I" admissions program, university President B. Joseph "Joe" White and Chancellor Richard Herman later admitted that there were instances of preferential treatment. Although they claimed the list was short and their role was minor, the Tribune, in particular, revealed emails through a FOIA finding that White had received a recommendation for a relative of convicted fundraiser Tony Rezko to be admitted. The Tribune also later posted emails from Herman pushing for underqualified students to be accepted. The Tribune has since filed suit against the university administration under the Freedom of Information Act to acquire the names of students benefited by administrative clout and impropriety.

2010s
On February 8, 2010, the Chicago Tribune shrank its newspaper's width by an inch. They said that the new format was becoming the industry standard and that there would be minimal content changes.

In July 2011, the Chicago Tribune underwent its first round of layoffs of editorial employees in more than two years, letting go about 20 editors and reporters. Among those let go were DuPage County reporter Art Barnum, Editorial Board member Pat Widder and photographer Dave Pierini.

On March 15, 2012, the Tribune laid off 15 editorial staffers, including security guard Wendell Smothers (Smothers then died on November 12, 2012). At the same time, the paper gave buyouts to six editorial staffers, including Pulitzer Prize-winning reporter William Mullen, Barbara Mahany and Nancy Reese.

In June 2012, the Tribunes Pulitzer Prize-winning cultural critic Julia Keller left the paper to join the faculty of Ohio University and to pursue a career as a novelist.

In September 2012, Tribune education reporter Joel Hood resigned from the paper to become a real estate broker, City Hall reporter Kristen Mack left the paper to become press secretary for Cook County Board President Toni Preckwinkle, and the Tribune hired Pulitzer Prize-winning photographer John J. Kim from the Chicago Sun-Times.

In October 2012, the Tribunes science and medicine reporter, Trine Tsouderos, quit to join a public relations firm.

Also in October 2012, the Tribune announced plans to create a paywall for its website, offering digital-only subscriptions at $14.99 per month, starting on November 1, 2012. Seven-day print subscribers would continue to have unlimited online access at no additional charge.

In late February 2013, the Tribune agreed to pay a total of $660,000 to settle a class-action lawsuit that had been filed against the paper by 46 current and former reporters of its TribLocal local-news reporting group over unpaid overtime wages. The suit had been filed in federal court on behalf of Carolyn Rusin, who had been a TribLocal staff reporter from July 2010 until October 2011. The paper's TribLocal unit had been formed in 2007 and uses staff reporters, freelance writers and user-generated content to produce hyperlocal Chicago-area community news.

On June 12, 2013, the Boston Marathon bombing moving tribute was posted again, which showed the words "We are Chicago" above the names of Boston sports teams. On the graphic on June 12, the word "Bruins" was ripped off and the comment was added, "Yeah, not right now we're not", in a reference to the 2013 Stanley Cup Finals, which play the Chicago Blackhawks against the Boston Bruins. Gerould Kern tweeted later that the Tribune "still supports [Boston] after all you've been through. We regret any offense. Now let's play hockey."

On November 20, 2013, the Tribune laid off another 12 or so editorial staffers.

On April 6, 2014, the Tribune increased the newsstand price of its Sunday/Thanksgiving Day paper by 50 percent to $2.99 for a single copy. The newsrack price increased $0.75, or 42.9%, to $2.50. By January 2017 the price increased again, up $1 or 40% at newsracks, to $3.50. At newsstands it went up also $1, or 33.3%, to $3.99.

On January 28, 2015, metropolitan editor Peter Kendall was named managing editor, replacing Jane Hirt, who had resigned several months earlier. Colin McMahon was named associate editor.

On February 18, 2016, the Tribune announced the retirement of editor Gerould Kern and the immediate promotion of the paper's editorial page editor, R. Bruce Dold, to be the Tribune's editor.

On Jun 9, 2018 the Tribune ended their 93-year stint at Tribune Tower and moved to One Prudential Plaza. The tower was later converted to condos.

2020s

On February 27, 2020, the Tribune announced that publisher and editor Bruce Dold will leave the Tribune on April 30, 2020, and would step down immediately as editor in chief. His replacement as editor was Colin McMahon. Also, the paper announced that one of the two managing editors of the paper, Peter Kendall, would leave the Tribune on February 28, 2020.

In January 2021, the Chicago Tribune moved out of One Prudential Plaza, and relocated their offices and newsroom to Freedom Center.

In May 2021 the paper was purchased by Alden Global Capital. Alden immediately launched a round of employee buyouts, reducing the newsroom staff by 25 percent, and the cuts continued. A former reporter said the paper is being "snuffed out, quarter after quarter after quarter". A report in The Atlantic said that Alden's business model is simple: "Gut the staff, sell the real estate, jack up subscription prices, and wring as much cash as possible out of the enterprise until eventually enough readers cancel their subscriptions that the paper folds, or is reduced to a desiccated husk of its former self."

Mitch Pugh was named the Tribune's executive editor on Aug. 20, 2021, after eight years in the same role at The Post and Courier in Charleston, South Carolina.

Editorial

Policy
In a 2007 statement of principles published in the Tribunes print and online editions, the paper's editorial board described the newspaper's philosophy, from which is excerpted the following:
The Chicago Tribune believes in the traditional principles of limited government; maximum individual responsibility; minimum restriction of personal liberty, opportunity and enterprise. It believes in free markets, free will and freedom of expression. These principles, while traditionally conservative, are guidelines and not reflexive dogmas.

The Tribune brings a Midwestern sensibility to public debate. It is suspicious of untested ideas.

The Tribune places great emphasis on the integrity of government and the private institutions that play a significant role in society. The newspaper does this in the belief that the people cannot consent to be governed unless they have knowledge of, and faith in, the leaders and operations of government. The Tribune embraces the diversity of people and perspectives in its community. It is dedicated to the future of the Chicago region.

The Tribune has remained economically conservative, being widely skeptical of increasing the minimum wage and entitlement spending. Although the Tribune criticized the Bush administration's record on civil liberties, the environment, and many aspects of its foreign policy, it continued to support his presidency while taking Democrats, such as Illinois Governor Rod Blagojevich and Cook County Board President Todd Stroger, to task and calling for their removal from office.

, the Chicago Tribune and Los Angeles Times have taken down their websites in most European countries due to GDPR.

Election endorsements
In 2004, the Tribune endorsed President George W. Bush for reelection, a decision consistent with its longstanding support for the Republican Party. In 2008, it endorsed Democratic candidate and Illinois junior U.S. Senator Barack Obama—the first time that it had ever endorsed a Democrat for president. The Tribune endorsed Obama once again for reelection in 2012, and in 2020 would endorse another Democrat, Joe Biden, who had served as vice president under Obama.

The Tribune has occasionally backed independent candidates for president. In 1872, it supported Horace Greeley, a former Republican Party newspaper editor, and in 1912 the paper endorsed Theodore Roosevelt, who ran on the Progressive Party slate against Republican President William Howard Taft. In 2016, the Tribune endorsed the Libertarian Party candidate, former New Mexico Governor Gary Johnson, for president, over Republican Donald Trump and Democrat Hillary Clinton.

Over the years, the Tribune has endorsed some Democrats for lesser offices, including recent endorsements of Bill Foster, Barack Obama for the Senate and Democrat Melissa Bean, who defeated Philip Crane, the House of Representatives' longest-serving Republican. Although the Tribune endorsed George Ryan in the 1998 Illinois gubernatorial race, the paper subsequently investigated and reported on the scandals surrounding Ryan during his preceding years as Secretary of State. Ryan declined to run for re-election in 2002 and was subsequently indicted, convicted and imprisoned as a result of the scandal.

Tribune Company

The Chicago Tribune is the founding business unit of Tribune Company (since renamed Tribune Media), which included many newspapers and television stations around the country. In Chicago, Tribune Media owns the WGN radio station (720 AM) and WGN-TV (Channel 9). Tribune Company also owned the Los Angeles Times—which displaced the Tribune as the company's largest property—and the Chicago Cubs baseball team. The Cubs were sold in 2009;the newspapers spun off in 2014 as Tribune Publishing.

Tribune Company owned the New York Daily News from its 1919 founding until its 1991 sale to British newspaper magnate Robert Maxwell. The founder of the NewsCapt. Joseph Medill Patterson, was a grandson of Joseph Medill and a cousin of Tribune editor Robert McCormick. Both Patterson and McCormick were enthusiasts of simplified spelling, another hallmark of their papers for many years. In 2008, the Tribune Company sold the Long Island newspaper Newsday—founded in 1940 by Patterson's daughter (and Medill's great-granddaughter), Alicia Patterson—to Long Island cable TV company Cablevision.

From 1925 to 2018, the Chicago Tribune was housed in the Tribune Tower on North Michigan Avenue on the Magnificent Mile. The building is neo-Gothic in style, and the design was the winner of an international competition hosted by the Tribune. The Chicago Tribune moved in June 2018 to the Prudential Plaza office complex overlooking Millennium Park after Tribune Media sold Tribune Tower to developers.

Columnists

Current
 Amy Dickinson
 Chris Jones
 Clarence Page
 Michael Phillips
 Nina Metz
 Laura Washington

Past
 William Armstrong
 Skip Bayless
 Claudia Cassidy
 Steve Chapman
 Steve Daley
 Mike Downey
 Dahleen Glanton
 Bob Greene
 David Haugh
 Vernon Jarrett
 Blair Kamin
 John Kass
 Hugh Keough
 Ann Landers
 Ring Lardner
 Charles Madigan
 Steve Neal
 Jack Mabley
 Mike Royko
 Mary Schmich
 Gene Siskel
 Heidi Stevens
 Arch Ward
 Eric Zorn
 Rex Huppke

2008 redesign
The September 2008 redesign (discussed on the Tribune's web site) was controversial and is largely regarded as an effort in cost-cutting. Since then the newspaper has returned to a more toned down style. The style is more a mix of the old style and a new modern style.

Zell ownership and bankruptcy
In December 2007, the Tribune Company was bought out by Chicago real estate magnate Sam Zell in an $8.2 billion deal. Zell was the company's new chairman. A year after going private, following a $124 million third-quarter loss, the Tribune Company filed for Chapter 11 bankruptcy protection on December 8, 2008. The company made its filing with the U.S. Bankruptcy Court for the District of Delaware, citing a debt of $13 billion and assets of $7.6 billion.

Sam Zell originally planned to turn the company into a private company through the creation of an ESOP (employee stock ownership plan) within the company, but due to poor management that existed prior to his ownership, this did not work out as well as he intended.

As part of its bankruptcy plan, owner Sam Zell intended to sell the Cubs to reduce debt. This sale has become linked to the corruption charges leading to the December 9, 2008, arrest of former Illinois Governor Rod Blagojevich. Specifically, the ex-governor was accused of exploiting the paper's financial trouble in an effort to have several editors fired.

In the bankruptcy, unsecured bondholders of Tribune Co. essentially claimed that ordinary Tribune shareholders participated in a "fraudulent transfer" of wealth.

The law firm Brown Rudnick, representing the Aurelius group of junior creditors, filed fraudulent transfer claims and fraud claims against 33,000 to 35,000 stockholders who bought Tribune stock. Prolonged due to these claims against former officers, directors, and every former stockholder of the Chicago Tribune Company, the Tribune's bankruptcy-related legal and professional fees of $500 million were more than twice the usual amount for that size of company.

The Tribune Co. emerged from bankruptcy in January 2013, partially owned by private equity firms which had speculated on its distressed debt. The reorganized company's plan included selling off many of its assets.

Tribune Publishing divestment
Tribune Publishing, owning the Chicago Tribune, Los Angeles Times, and eight other newspapers, was spun off as a separate publicly traded company in August 2014. The parent Tribune Company was renamed Tribune Media. Tribune Publishing started life with a $350 million loan, $275 million of which was paid as a dividend to Tribune Media. The publishing company was also due to lease its office space from Tribune Media for $30 million per year through 2017.

Spinning off Tribune Publishing avoided the capital gains taxes that would accrue from selling those assets. The shares in Tribune Publishing were given tax-free to stakeholders in Tribune Media, the largest shareholder was Oaktree Capital Management with 18.5%. Tribune Media, retaining the non-newspaper broadcasting, entertainment, real estate, and other investments, also sold off some of the non-newspaper properties.

See also

 Chicago Tribune Syndicate
 Chicago Tribune Silver Basketball
 Chicago Tribune Silver Football

References

Further reading
 
 
 
 Mayer, Gordon. "Party Rags? Politics and the News Business in Chicago's Party Press, 1831–71." Journalism History 32#3 (2006): 138+
 
 
 
 Ziv, Nina. "The Chicagotribune. com: Creating a Newspaper for the New Economy" jn Strategic Management: Concepts and Cases (2002). online

External links

 
 
 
 Chicago Tribune Archives (1849 to present)
 Tribune Company corporate web site
 Tribune Group Overview (external corporate profile)
 Janet A. Ginsburg Chicago Tribune Collection (1880s to 1940s) (searchable database of 12,000 images on 5,500 pages, digitized and available for all educational uses worldwide)
 Institutions that own print and microfilm of this newspaper at the Illinois Newspaper Project
 John Tinney McCutcheon Editorial Cartoon Collection Collection of editorial cartoons published in the Chicago Tribune in the early twentieth century. (At the University of Missouri.)

 
1847 establishments in Illinois
Daily newspapers published in the United States
Newspapers published in Chicago
Old Right (United States)
Newspapers established in 1847
Companies that filed for Chapter 11 bankruptcy in 2008
Pulitzer Prize for Explanatory Journalism winners
Pulitzer Prize for Investigative Reporting winners
Pulitzer Prize-winning newspapers
Tribune Publishing